Baxtiyar Pezila (born 17 November 1998) is a Chinese footballer currently playing as a midfielder for Chongqing Liangjiang.

Club career
Baxtiyar Pezila was promoted to the senior team of Xinjiang Tianshan Leopard within the 2018 China League One season and would make his debut in a league game on 10 March 2018 against Liaoning F.C. in a 2-0 defeat. After the game he would quickly establish himself as a regular within the team and go on to make 23 appearances for the club. On 21 February 2019 he would sign for top tier club Chongqing Lifan. On 4 February 2020 he was loaned out to Recreativo Granada.

Career statistics

Notes

References

External links

1998 births
Living people
Uyghur sportspeople
Chinese footballers
Chinese people of Uyghur descent
Association football midfielders
Chinese Super League players
China League One players
Xinjiang Tianshan Leopard F.C. players
Chongqing Liangjiang Athletic F.C. players
Club Recreativo Granada players
Chinese expatriate footballers
Chinese expatriate sportspeople in Spain
Expatriate footballers in Spain